Kirants is a village in the Ijevan Municipality of the Tavush Province of Armenia. The 8th-century Kirants Monastery, and the 13th-century Arakelots Monastery are located near Kirants.

Toponymy 
The village was known as Getashen until 1967.

Gallery

References

External links 

Populated places in Tavush Province